Siim is both an  Estonian masculine given name and less commonly, a surname. It is sometimes a diminutive of the given names Siimon and Siimeon, cognates of the given names Simon and Simeon.

Individuals bearing the name Siim include:
Given name
Siim Avi (born 1984), Estonian politician and lawyer 
Siim Kabrits (born 1979), Estonian politician 
Siim Kallas (born 1948), Estonian politician
Siim-Valmar Kiisler (born 1965), Estonian politician
Siim Liivik (born 1988), Estonian-Finnish ice hockey player
Siim Luts (born 1989), Estonian professional footballer
Siim Pohlak (born 1985), Estonian businessman and politician
Siim-Markus Post (born 1997), Estonian basketball player
Siim Roops (born 1986), Estonian professional footballer
Siim-Tanel Sammelselg (born 1993), Estonian ski-jumper
Siim Sellis (born 1987), Estonian cross-country skier
Siim Sukles (born 1972), Estonian sport figure
Siim Tenno (born 1990), Estonian football midfielder
Siim Troost (born 1999), Estonian tennis player
Siim-Sander Vene (born 1990), Estonian professional basketballer

Surname
Andres Siim (born 1962), Estonian architect

References

Masculine given names
Estonian masculine given names
Estonian-language surnames